Hart Township is one of ten townships in Warrick County, Indiana, United States. As of the 2010 census, its population was 1,626 and it contained 691 housing units.

History
Hart Township was organized in 1826. The township was named for John Hart, a local judge.

Geography

Cities, towns, villages
 Lynnville

Unincorporated towns
 Eby at 
 Graham Valley at 
 Greenbrier at 
 Stanley at 
 Turpin Hill at 
(This list is based on USGS data and may include former settlements.)

Adjacent townships
 Monroe Township, Pike County (north)
 Lane Township (east)
 Owen Township (east)
 Boon Township (south)
 Campbell Township (southwest)
 Greer Township (west)
 Barton Township, Gibson County (northwest)

Cemeteries
Hart township contains these six cemeteries: Lynnville, Massey, Morrison, Mount Olive, Mt. Zion, and Turpin Hill Cemetery

School districts
 Warrick County School Corporation

Political districts
 Indiana's 8th congressional district
 State House District 74
 State Senate District 50

References
 United States Census Bureau 2007 TIGER/Line Shapefiles
 United States Board on Geographic Names (GNIS)
 IndianaMap

External links
 Indiana Township Association
 United Township Association of Indiana

Townships in Warrick County, Indiana
Townships in Indiana